Calumet is the third album by Lobo, released in 1973 on Big Tree Records. It was reissued in 2008 by Wounded Bird Records and includes six bonus tracks.

The album peaked at No. 128 on the US Top LPs chart. Two of its singles were top 30 hits on the Billboard Hot 100 and top 5 hits on the Easy Listening chart. "There Ain't No Way" and its B-side "Love Me For What I Am" were minor hits on the Hot 100.

Track listing
All songs are written by Kent LaVoie.

Personnel
Lobo - guitar, lead
Roy Yeager - drums, percussion
Barry Harwood - guitar
Jim Ellis - keyboards

Production
Producer: Phil Gernhard
Photography: Ed Caraeff

Charts
Album

'''Singles

References

External links

1973 albums
Big Tree Records albums
Lobo (musician) albums